Miramar is an Argentine city located on the coast of the Atlantic Ocean in Buenos Aires Province,  south of Buenos Aires. It is the administrative seat of General Alvarado Partido. The name “Miramar” comes from the words mira (view) and mar (sea).

History

1870: The land that now includes General Alvarado Partido came into the ownership of Fortunato de La Plaza.

1879: The area changes jurisdiction from Balcarce to General Pueyrredón.

1887: It was around this time the project to build Miramar was undertaken by Jose María Dupuy, Rómulo Otamendi (engineer) and Fortunato de la Plaza.

1888: Miramar was founded on 20 September.

1889: Construction began on the first church in Miramar.

1891: The Partido of General Alvarado was created on September 29, with Miramar as its capital.

1911: The Buenos Aires Great Southern Railway arrived in Miramar and the company later built a comfortable hotel and adjoining golf course in the town.

1920: The first aeroplane arrives in Miramar.

1927: The Buenos Aires Great Southern Railway began the construction of the Miramar golf course.

1930: The hotel Dormy House was built adjacent to the golf course by the Buenos Aires Great Southern Railway, and later a tunnel was built to provide access to the sea from the hotel

2001: The murder of Natalia Melmann

Economy

The summer tourist season provides the most significant contribution to the economy of Miramar. Other economic activities include farming and agroindustry, with most of these concentrated around the nearby village of Comandante Nicanor Otamendi.

Attractions

Miramar Golf Course.
Museo Punta Hermengo, museum.
Vivero Dunícola Florentino Ameghino, 5.02 km² of woodland.
Enchanted Forest or Energic Forest 
Aero Club de la ciudad de Miramar, Aerodrome.
Autodromo Roberto Hirch de Miramar, 1.47/1.72 km motor racing venue.
Vivero Dunícola "Florentino Ameghino"
The dunes: 12 km of sand beaches - South of Miramar. 
The "Médano Blanco" (white dune), one of the tallest and close to "La Totora" brook.

Other attractions include the rivers Durazno and Brusquitas, an ecological reserve and a number of beaches.

References

External links

 El Seminario newspaper 
 Portal of Miramar 
 Portal of Miramar 

Populated places in Buenos Aires Province
Populated places established in 1888
Populated coastal places in Argentina
Seaside resorts in Argentina
Cities in Argentina
Argentina